Raymond Reath Powell (November 20, 1888 – October 16, 1962), was a professional baseball player who played outfielder in the Major Leagues from -. Powell played for the Detroit Tigers and Boston Braves.

In 875 games over 9 seasons, Powell posted a .268 batting average (890-for-3324) with 467 runs, 117 doubles, 67 triples, 35 home runs, 276 RBI, 51 stolen bases, 321 bases on balls, .336 on-base percentage and .375 slugging percentage. He finished his career with a .959 fielding percentage playing at all three outfield positions.

External links

thebaseballpage.com

1888 births
1962 deaths
Major League Baseball outfielders
Baseball players from Arkansas
Detroit Tigers players
Boston Braves players
Minor league baseball managers
Bartlesville Boosters players
St. Joseph Drummers players
Providence Grays (minor league) players
Houston Buffaloes players
Shawnee Robins players
Quincy Indians players
Siloam Springs Travelers players
People from Siloam Springs, Arkansas
Norfolk Yankees players